The Russia men's national under-21 volleyball team represents Russia in international men's volleyball competitions and friendly matches under the age 21. It is ruled by the Russian Volleyball Federation, an affiliate of the International Volleyball Federation (FIVB) and of the European Volleyball Confederation (CEV).

In response to the 2022 Russian invasion of Ukraine, the International Volleyball Federation suspended all Russian national teams, clubs, and officials, as well as beach and snow volleyball athletes, from all events. The European Volleyball Confederation (CEV) also banned all Russian national teams, clubs, and officials from participating in European competition, and suspended all members of Russia from their respective functions in CEV organs.

Results

FIVB U21 World Championship
 Champions   Runners-up   3rd place   4th place

Europe U21 / 20 Championship
 Champions   Runners-up   3rd place   4th place

Team

Current squad
The following is the Russian roster in the 2019 FIVB Volleyball Men's U21 World Championship.

Head coach: Andrey Nozdrin

References

External links
 Official website 

 

National men's under-21 volleyball teams
U
Volleyball in Russia